The Complete Beatles Recording Sessions (subtitled The Official Story of the Abbey Road Years 1962–1970) is a reference book on the English rock band the Beatles compiled by author Mark Lewisohn. Hamlyn published it in the UK in 1988 and Harmony Books published it in the US.

The book is written in the form of a diary, documenting each day from 1962 through 1970 that the Beatles spent in a recording session or producers and engineers spent mixing and editing their music. The book has been widely described as an "essential" reference book for study of the band.

Background 
In the early 1980s, EMI balance engineer John Barrett found himself unoccupied while undergoing chemotherapy. Ken Townsend, the General Manager of Abbey Road Studios, later recalled suggesting Barrett keep his mind engaged by listening to the Beatles' session tapes and write down information pertaining to them. Author Stephen Matteo alternatively suggests Barrett's work was intended to gather interesting unreleased material for The Beatles at Abbey Road, a 1983 multimedia presentation at Abbey Road Studios. Barrett produced a colour-coded catalogue, which Townsend later said displayed an "incredible" attention to detail. In 1982, while attending Liverpool's annual Beatles convention, Townsend, Barrett and author Brian Southall used Barrett's work during a Q&A session. Attendees were enthusiastic about the new information and suggested the catalogue be published, but Barrett's death in 1984 precluded it. The project was nearly abandoned until Abbey Road employee Kathryn Varley pushed for its completion.

Mark Lewisohn began formally researching the Beatles in the late 1970s, working as a research assistant for Philip Norman's book Shout! (1981). In 1986, Lewisohn published his first reference book, The Beatles Live!, a chronological guide of the group's live performances. The book took years to research and compiles over 1,000 primary sources to provide an exhaustive guide.

Because of his work compiling The Beatles Live!, EMI commissioned Lewisohn in 1987 to continue Barrett's work and write a book detailing the Beatles' recording sessions. Besides Abbey Road Studios staffers and the Beatles, Lewisohn was the first person granted access to listen to all of the Beatles' working tapes, a privilege not extended again until 1995 for writer Mark Hertsgaard. Working from 1987 through 1988, the book took two years to research and write. Lewisohn consulted the studio's recording paperwork, reproducing some of it in the book, and interviewed eighty people who were present at the sessions, including the Beatles' producer George Martin, publicist Derek Taylor and engineer Geoff Emerick. Besides Barrett's previous research, the collection of Beatles recordings stored at Abbey Road Studios had never been properly archived. Listening to over four hundred hours of tapes, Lewisohn's working process served the dual purpose of both researching the book as well as organising the collection, cataloguing its various mixes, submixes, mastertakes and outtakes.

Publication and content 

Hamlyn published The Complete Beatles Recording Sessions in the UK in 1988. Harmony Books published it the same year in the US, re-titled as The Beatles Recording Sessions. A book launch was held in October 1988 at Abbey Road Studios, with wax figures of the Beatles temporarily moved to the studio from London's Madame Tussauds wax museum for the event.

Spanning 204 pages, most of The Complete Beatles Recording Session is written in the form of a diary detailing each day either the Beatles spent in a recording session or producers and engineers spent mixing and editing their music. The diary begins with the band's first recording session at EMI Recording Studios on 6 June 1962, while drummer Pete Best was still in the band, and finishes on 8 May 1970 with the release of the album Let It Be. The book includes a one-page preface by Ken Townsend and a ten-page interview between Lewisohn and Paul McCartney.

Each entry first notes the date; the studio location, usually EMI or Apple Studios; the session time; the songs recorded or mixed, including the number of takes; and the names of the producer and engineers involved. Lewisohn then writes about the details of the particular session, such as overdubbing, false starts and studio chatter, as well as information about session musicians, orchestration and any other related information. He discusses the fate of various session tapes, the differences between mono and stereo mixes and the technical advancements first pioneered on the Beatles' recordings. UK release dates of singles, albums and EPs are also mentioned, discussing their chart success and sales numbers.

Following the diary entries, the book includes a complete discography of all the Beatles' UK and US releases, including singles, EPs and albums. It concludes with a glossary of recording industry terms and a note from Townsend on the recording technology used by the band.

Impact and legacy 

The book has been widely described as an "essential" Beatles reference book, required reading for anyone attempting a serious study of the band. In Michael Brocken and Melissa Davis's guide to Beatles literature, The Beatles Bibliography, they describe it as "one of the cornerstones of Beatles scholarship", and authors Stuart Shea and Robert Rodriguez characterise it as "[p]ossibly the most important Beatles book ever published", writing it was a "landmark" by providing the general public with so much previously unknown information.

Later writers have relied heavily on the book's research, such as Ian MacDonald and Mark Hertsgaard, who each described it as being indispensable for the research of their own books, Revolution in the Head (1994) and A Day in the Life (1995), respectively. Hertsgaard further writes it is "superb, but superb in the way an encyclopedia is superb", contending that it provides much more than the typical reader would expect, leaving a book that "focuses more on the trees than on the forest". Critic Tim Riley writes the book is "indispensable for close listening", and concludes its research is "invaluable but not imperfect". He criticises Lewisohn for writing more like a fan than a critic, with his descriptions reliant on adjectives like "brilliant" rather than evaluating a recording's "color, texture and mood". Colin Fleming of Rolling Stone magazine similarly finds Lewisohn's descriptions of songs lacking, while still retaining an ability to make the listener feel engrossed in the particular recording session. Writing for Pitchfork in 2018, Stephen Thomas Erlewine also finds the book absorbing in its narrative of particular sessions. Author Chris Ingham writes that the book is useful for researchers while also being an easy read due to "Lewisohn's neutrally enthusiastic tone".

The book was one of the first to document a band or artist through their recording sessions. Similar books covering Elvis Presley, Bob Dylan and Jimi Hendrix were written following its release. In the introduction to his 1995 book on Dylan's recording sessions, Clinton Heylin acknowledges that Lewisohn's book remains "perhaps the best-known 'sessionography. David Hunter of the University of Texas at Austin describes the book as a "bio-discography" – a portmanteau of biography and discography – illustrating the Beatles' progression and story through study of their recorded music. He writes that it serves as "the standard by which all bio-discographies will be measured". Lewisohn's 1992 book, The Complete Beatles Chronicle, combines the work of The Complete Beatles Recording Sessions with The Beatles Live! to provide an exhaustive day-by-day account of the group.

Notes

References 
 Secondary sources 

 Citations to The Complete Beatles Recording Sessions

Bibliography 
 Books 

 
 
 
 
 
 
 
 
 
 
 
 
 
 
 
 
 
 
 
 

 Journal, magazine and newspaper articles

External links 

UK edition
 
 [ The Complete Beatles Recording Sessions] at Google Books

US edition
 
 [ The Beatles Recording Sessions] at Google Books

1988 non-fiction books
Books about the Beatles
English non-fiction books